= Koli Fayaz =

Indian crime boss in Bangalore (died 1995)

Koli Fayaz / Murgi Fayaz
- Born: Fayaz
- Died: June 1995
- Cause of death: Gang attack
- Occupations: Poultry business, contract killing, forced property evictions

Fayaz, also known as Koli Fayaz and Murgi Fayaz, was one of the underworld dons of Bangalore in the 1980s and 1990s. He was called 'Koli' Fayaz because he ran a poultry farm.

He was killed in 1995 by a gang attack led by Rizwan, Sultan, chappal Hameed, Tanveer his closest associate later took power over Shivajinagar for over a decade.[5]
